Contemporary Movement is the second studio album by American slowcore band Duster. The album was released in 2000 on Up Records.

Unlike Duster's previous album Stratosphere, all three band members were involved in the making of Contemporary Movement.

The album was issued on both vinyl and CD. The album's cover art depicts the parking structures at the Seattle–Tacoma International Airport. Contemporary Movement was later reissued as part of the Capsule Losing Contact box set.

Critical reception
Portland Mercury wrote that "Duster’s unhurried compositions never fully clarify or cohere; voices hide behind dense washes of guitar, verses reach toward choruses that aren’t there, songs end abruptly before they can be caught, tagged, and filed away."

Track listing

References

Up Records albums
Duster (band) albums
2000 albums